The 1985 Missouri Tigers football team was an American football team that represented the University of Missouri in the Big Eight Conference (Big 8) during the 1985 NCAA Division I-A football season. The team compiled a 1–10 record (1–6 against Big 8 opponents), finished in a tie for last place in the Big 8, and was outscored by opponents by a combined total of 342 to 206. Woody Widenhofer was the head coach for the first of four seasons. The team played its home games at Faurot Field in Columbia, Missouri.

The team's statistical leaders included Darrell Wallace with 1,120 rushing yards, Marlon Adler with 1,258 passing yards, and Herbert Johnson with 806 receiving yards.

Schedule

References

Missouri
Missouri Tigers football seasons
Missouri Tigers football